Jefferson County is located in the Shenandoah Valley in the Eastern Panhandle of West Virginia. It is the easternmost county of the U.S. state of West Virginia. As of the 2020 census, the population was 57,701. Its county seat is Charles Town. The county was founded in 1801, and today is part of the Washington metropolitan area.

History

Formation
Jefferson County was established on October 26, 1801 from Berkeley County because the citizens of southeastern Berkeley County felt they had to travel too far to the county seat of Martinsburg. Charles Washington, the founder of Charles Town and brother to George Washington petitioned for a new county to be formed. It was named for Thomas Jefferson, author of the Declaration of Independence and third President of the United States. Virginia previously had a Jefferson County, which is now part of Kentucky. Accordingly, in the State records of Virginia, there are listings for Jefferson County from 1780 to 1792 and Jefferson County from 1801 to 1863, neither of which are still in Virginia.

John Brown rebellion

The county's courthouse was the site of the trial for the abolitionist John Brown after his October 1859 raid on the federal armory in Harpers Ferry. Some 90 U.S. Marines serving under then Army Colonel Robert E. Lee and Lieutenants J.E.B. Stuart and Israel Greene put down the rebellion.

Brown was sentenced to death for murder, treason against the Commonwealth of Virginia, and conspiring with slaves to rebel. On 2 December 1859 John Brown was taken from the Charles Town jail a short distance to an open field and hanged. Among those attending the Brown execution was a contingent of 1500 cadets from Virginia Military Institute sent by the Governor of Virginia Henry A. Wise under the supervision of Major William Gilham and Major Thomas J. Jackson. In the ranks of a Richmond militia company stood John Wilkes Booth. Walt Whitman was also present.

Civil War
The county was a frequent site of conflict during the Civil War, as Union and Confederate lines moved back and forth along the Shenandoah Valley.  Some towns in the county changed hands between the Union and Confederacy over a dozen times, including Charles Town, and especially Harpers Ferry.

Jefferson County is the only part of modern-day West Virginia not exempted from the effects of the Emancipation Proclamation (as Berkeley County and the 48 counties designated as West Virginia had been).  Slaves in the county thus were legally free as of January 1, 1863.

The Jefferson County Courthouse is the only courthouse in America to have held two treason trials: the trial of John Brown in 1859 and a trial arising from the Battle of Blair Mountain labor rebellion.

Joining West Virginia

Jefferson County had voted for secession in the vote taken on May 23, 1861. However, Jefferson County, along with Berkeley County, both counties lying on the Potomac River in the Shenandoah Valley, with the consent of the Reorganized Government of Virginia voted in favor of annexation to West Virginia in 1863 in a dubious election supervised by the occupying Union Army. Virginia tried to nullify this after the American Civil War, but the counties remained part of West Virginia.

The question of the constitutionality of the formation of the new state was brought before the Supreme Court of the United States in the following manner: Berkeley and Jefferson County, West Virginia, counties lying on the Potomac east of the mountains, in 1863, with the consent of the Reorganized Government of Virginia, had supposedly voted in favor of annexation to West Virginia. However, many voters were absent in the Confederate Army when the vote was taken and they refused to accept the transfer upon their return. The Virginia General Assembly repealed the Act of Secession and in 1866 brought suit against West Virginia, asking the Supreme Court to declare the counties still part of Virginia.  Congress, on March 10, 1866, passed a joint resolution recognizing the transfer. In 1871, the U.S. Supreme Court decided Virginia v. West Virginia, upholding the "secession" of West Virginia, including Berkeley and Jefferson counties, from Virginia. In 2011, West Virginia state delegate Larry Kump sponsored legislation to allow Morgan, Berkeley, and Jefferson counties to rejoin Virginia by popular vote.

County subdivisions
In 1863, West Virginia's counties were divided into civil townships, with the intention of encouraging local government.  This proved impractical in the heavily rural state, and in 1872 the townships were converted into magisterial districts.  Jefferson County was initially divided into five townships, which became magisterial districts in 1872: Averill, Bolivar, Chapline, Grant, and Shepherd.  In 1873, Averill District was renamed "Middleway", Chapline became "Potomac", and Grant District became "Charlestown".  Two additional districts, Harpers Ferry and Osburn, were created during the 1870s.  In the 1880s, Bolivar District was annexed by Harpers Ferry; Potomac and Shepherd were consolidated into Shepherdstown District, and Osburn was renamed "Kabletown".

Rural Free Delivery
In October 1896, Jefferson County became the first county in the United States to begin Rural Free Delivery service in the towns of Halltown and Uvilla.

Geography

It is the only West Virginia county where the Blue Ridge Mountains and Shenandoah River can be found, as referenced in West Virginia's state song, "Take Me Home, Country Roads" by John Denver. The lowest point in the state of West Virginia is located on the Potomac River (just east of Harpers Ferry) in Jefferson County, where it flows out of West Virginia and into Virginia.

National protected area
 Harpers Ferry National Historical Park (part)

Rivers and streams
Potomac River
Opequon Creek
Shenandoah River

Adjacent counties
Washington County, Maryland (north)
Loudoun County, Virginia (east)
Clarke County, Virginia (southwest)
Berkeley County (northwest)

Major highways

 U.S. Highway 340
 West Virginia Route 9
 West Virginia Route 45
 West Virginia Route 51
 West Virginia Route 115 (Old West Virginia Route 9)
 West Virginia Route 230

Demographics

2000 census

2010 census
As of the 2010 U.S. census, there were 53,498 people, 19,931 households, and 13,971 families residing in the county. The racial makeup of the county was 87.6% white, 6.6% black or African American, 1.2% Asian, 0.2% American Indian, 0.1% Pacific islander, 1.8% from other races, and 2.6% from two or more races. Those of Hispanic or Latino origin made up 4.7% of the population. In terms of ancestry, 25.9% were German, 17.3% were English, 12.1% were Irish, and 6.6% were American.

Of the 19,931 households, 34.6% had children under the age of 18 living with them, 54.9% were married couples living together, 10.1% had a female householder with no husband present, 29.9% were non-families, and 22.7% of all households were made up of individuals. The average household size was 2.61 and the average family size was 3.07. The median age was 38.9 years.

The median income for a household in the county was $65,603 and the median income for a family was $77,185. Males had a median income of $54,959 versus $36,782 for females. The per capita income for the county was $29,733. About 4.4% of families and 8.4% of the population were below the poverty line, including 10.9% of those under age 18 and 6.9% of those age 65 or over.

Government

Law enforcement
The Jefferson County Sheriff's Department provides law enforcement services in the county, and handles all 911 emergency and non emergency calls. In February 2007, Jefferson County Sheriff's Department Corporal Ronald Fletcher was shot and critically wounded during a stand-off at the residence of the girlfriend of a suspect, Dorsey Cox. Cox had been at his girlfriend's house retrieving personal items in violation of a court-ordered protective order. As Corporal Fletcher approached the house, Cox fled inside and subsequently shot Corporal Fletcher four times, one of which struck the officer in the chest. The State Police's SWAT team entered the house. Cox was later found dead of an apparent self-inflicted gunshot wound.

On June 5, 2012, Sheriff Robert Shirley was indicted on one count of deprivation of rights under color of law and one count of destruction, falsification or alteration of a record in a federal investigation. He is alleged to have beaten Mark Daniel Haines, who later pleaded guilty to bank robbery, during his arrest on December 27, 2010. He is also alleged to have altered a use of force report while the incident was under investigation by the Federal Bureau of Investigation. Shirley and 14 other "John Doe" law enforcement officers were also the subject of a civil rights lawsuit filed by Haines. The lawsuit alleges that Shirley and the other officers used excessive force while arresting Haines. Shirley pled guilty to federal civil rights charges of and was sentenced to a year in prison.

Politics
Jefferson County has been a Republican-leaning county in the 21st century, although Barack Obama carried it in the 2008 presidential election. For much of the 20th century, the county trended strongly Democratic due to historical sympathies for Confederate Virginia. In contrast to its rock-ribbed Unionist and Republican Eastern Panhandle sister Morgan County, Jefferson did not vote Republican until Dwight D. Eisenhower won by 27 votes in 1956, and afterwards voted Republican only in the 1972 and 1984 landslides, and in 1988. Despite their strong support for Republican presidential candidates in recent years, local Democrats still have success in Jefferson County. Even as recently as 2018, Senator Joe Manchin won the county in his successful reelection, despite the county being the home of his opponent, Patrick Morrisey.

Communities

Cities
Charles Town (county seat)
Ranson

Towns
Bolivar
Harpers Ferry
Shepherdstown

Magisterial districts
Charles Town
Harpers Ferry
Kabletown
Middleway
Shepherdstown

Census-designated places
Middleway
Shannondale
Shenandoah Junction

Unincorporated communities

Bakerton
Bardane
Blair
Bloomery
Blue Ridge Acres
Browns Corner
Duffields
Egypt
Engle
Franklintown
Halltown
Jamestown
Johnsontown
Kabletown
Kearneysville
Keyes Ferry Acres
Leetown
Mannings
Mechanicstown
Mechlenberg Heights
Meyerstown
Millville
Moler Crossroads
Mountain Mission
Reedson
Rippon
Riverside
Silver Grove
Skeetersville
Summit Point
Uvilla
Wheatland

Historic buildings and structures

 Middleway Historic District (1734)
 White House Farm (1740)
 Hopewell (Millville, West Virginia) (1765)
 Harewood (West Virginia) (1770)
 Mount Ellen (ca 1790)
 New Hopewell (1774),  a farm comprising agricultural fields and historical buildings, located between Johnsontown and Leetown
 Happy Retreat (1780)
 Blakeley (West Virginia) (1820)
 Claymont Court (1820)
 Cedar Lawn (1825)
 Barleywood Manor (1846)
 Jacks-Manning Farm (Vinton Farm) (1848)
 John Brown's Fort (1848)
 Grace Episcopal Church (1851)
 Kabletown Church (1861)
 Brown Shugart House (1885)

Gallery

See also
National Register of Historic Places listings in Jefferson County, West Virginia
Jefferson County Schools
Jefferson County Sheriff's Department

Footnotes

References

Further reading
 Coletti, Matthew, "'The Fate Which Takes Us:' Benjamin F. Beall and Jefferson County, (West) Virginia in the Civil War Era" (U. Of Massachusetts MA Thesis 2014) online, major local newspaper 1848–1870.

External links

 
1801 establishments in Virginia
Counties of Appalachia
Former counties of Virginia
Populated places established in 1801
Washington metropolitan area
West Virginia counties
West Virginia counties on the Potomac River